Fast Getaway is a 1991 action comedy film, starring Corey Haim, Cynthia Rothrock and Leo Rossi. A sequel Fast Getaway II was released in 1994.

Plot
Sixteen-year-old Nelson Potter is part of a bank robbing team with his father Sam — Nelson scouts targets for the group and acts as a hostage in their endeavors. Their accomplices include Tony and Lilly, the latter a skilled martial artist and Sam’s current love interest. Wanting Sam all to herself, Lilly tries to persuade him to cut Nelson from the group, but Sam declines. When she overhears him insulting her afterwards, Lilly refuses to give Nelson his share of the money from their latest heist and viciously attacks Sam, leading Nelson to subdue her at gunpoint. With the partnership dissolved, Tony and Lilly leave the group.

After stealing a new getaway car, Sam and Nelson continue on their own. Sam’s goal is to eventually steal enough money to pay for Nelson’s college education, although Nelson sees nothing wrong with robbing banks for a living. While robbing yet another bank in Utah, Tony and Lilly tip off the police from their hotel room across the street, and Sam is arrested. With Nelson deemed a runaway, Lilly and Tony rush to claim him at the police station, hoping to utilize him in their own robberies. However, a woman named Lorraine picks up Nelson first after learning about the attempted heist on television. She deftly evades Tony and Lilly in a high-speed chase and takes Nelson back to her home. Impressed with her driving skills, Nelson pleads for her help in breaking his father out of jail.

With Lorraine at the wheel, Nelson successfully retrieves Sam, who reveals that Lorraine is Nelson’s biological mother, having lied to his son about her death for years so that Nelson would stay with him after their separation. Feeling betrayed, Nelson tells his father he can no longer trust him. The next evening, Tony and Lilly track down Lorraine at her workplace and follow her back to her home, where they kidnap Nelson.

Using Nelson’s maps, atlas, and other resources, Sam and Lorraine deduce that his next target is not a bank, but instead the Salt Lake City Amphitheater. They race to confront Tony and Lilly, who have already robbed the venue by using Nelson as a hostage in a vest loaded with dynamite. After forcing Nelson into the back of their pickup truck at gunpoint, Tony and Lilly attempt to get away with Sam and Lorraine in hot pursuit.

In desperation, Lilly attacks Nelson and throws him from the truck, leaving him dragging precariously behind the vehicle on a strip of chain link fence. With Lilly distracted by a police helicopter, Sam climbs aboard the moving truck and gets the upper hand against Lilly, knocking her onto the highway. He then forces Tony off the road, giving Nelson enough time to remove the bomb and plant it in the truck. While Sam reaches for the detonator, Tony attempts to run him over, but Lorraine rams into the truck with her car at the last second, sending it tumbling down a cliff where it explodes. As the three drive away to seek medical treatment for Nelson, Tony is shown dangling helplessly from the face of the cliff, having survived the ordeal.

Sometime later, Sam, Nelson, and Lorraine embark on a road trip to Canada, where they jokingly make plans for their next bank robbery.

Cast
 Corey Haim as Nelson Potter
 Cynthia Rothrock as Lilly
 Leo Rossi as Sam Potter
 Ken Lerner as Tony Bush
 Marcia Strassman as Lorraine
 Shelli Lether as Honey
 Tabitha Thompson as Girl At Bank
 Jack North as Car Salesman
 Kim Peach as Cissy
 Jeff Olson as Chief Malone
 Richard Jewkes as Sheriff McQuade
 Bernie Pock as Deputy
 Corky Edgar as Bank Teller
 Kelly Ausland as Armored Guard
 Patrick Redford as Officer

Production
Parts of the film were shot in Park City, Utah.
The first chase scene Sam, Leo Rossi, drives their Chevy Citation in reverse and it is filmed in Provo, Utah. The majority of the chase takes place on center street between 500 west and University avenue. At approximately 5:20 You can see the Provo police station, located on the south/east corner of 300 west and center street.

Major parts of the movie are filmed in Heber City, Utah. After they are arrested, Corey is picked up and walked out of the Heber City Tabernacle. The Gas station with the rounded top is in the center of Heber. Several other scenes are filmed in and around Heber.

59 minutes into the film, Corey Haim breaks Leo Rossi out of jail with an original escape route.  Corey Haim and Leo Rossi climb onto a roof and have to jump down onto the deck to get away from the pursuing deputy sheriffs that were Leo’s jailers. The raised porch is on the business west of the restaurant Los Hermanos, on the corner of University avenue and center street in Provo.

References

External links
 
 Fast Getaway trailer at Videodetective.com
 

1991 films
1991 action comedy films
1990s American films
1990s English-language films
1990s teen comedy films
American action comedy films
American chase films
American independent films
American teen comedy films
CineTel Films films
Films shot in Utah